is a Japanese ultramarathon runner. Sakurai is the current women's 100 km Track world record holder, and the current women's 6H Track world record holder,> and 2007 female winner of IAU 24-Hour Run 100 km World Championship. She is a three time female winner of 100 km Lake Saroma Ultramarathon and a five-time female winner of Hasetsune cup, an endurance trail race in Japan.

Achievements

World Records 
Women's 100 km Track,  7:14:06,  Lupatotissima ,  Sep 2003
Women's 6hour Track,  Lupatoto Verone ,  Sept 2003

World Championship
2007 female winner of IAU 24-hour run 100 km World Championship, 7:00:27, Winschoten

Other races
2001, 2003, 2007 female winner of Lake Saroma Ultramarathon, an IAU endorsed official 100 km race in Hokkaido, Japan
2002,2003,2005,2006,2008 female winner of Hasetsune cup, a 71.5 km trail in steep mountains in Japan. Sakurai's 2008 time of 8:54:07 is the current course record.

Personal life
Sakurai was in the school's athletic club in her teens, and competed on the Wandervogel Club in University. After joining her first full marathon in 1996, Sakurai started joining various types of ultramarathon events. She now works for Adventure Divas and runs as a guide for people with hearing difficulties.

When Sakurai won the 2007 World Championship in Netherland, she ran with her water bottle in hand until the next aid station came. When asked, she answered that she did not want to throw it on the street.

References

1971 births
Living people
Japanese ultramarathon runners
Japanese female long-distance runners
Female ultramarathon runners
Trail runners
IAU Trail World Championships winners
20th-century Japanese women
21st-century Japanese women